Watson Creek may refer to:

 Watson Creek (California)
 Watson Creek (Minnesota)
 Watson Creek (Pennsylvania)
 Watson Creek (Richardson Creek tributary), a stream in Union County, North Carolina